The third season (2016–2017) of the Turkish TV series, Diriliş: Ertuğrul, created by Mehmet Bozdağ succeeds the second season and precedes the fourth season of Diriliş: Ertuğrul. Season 3, and consequently season 4, were the only two seasons to be filmed in Nevşehir rather than Riva.

Plot 
The poor Kayı newcomers face Ural of the rich Çavdar trade-veterans. Although Ural isn't the Bey of his tribe, he seeks more and more power, becoming jealous of the Kayı whenever something good happens . Meanwhile, the Templars who have infiltrated Hanlı Pazar, led by Hancı Simon, seek to kill Ertuğrul as he did to the Templars years back. Ertuğrul defeats Hancı Simon and conquers Hanlı Pazar, leaving Ural more jealous than ever. When Ural is accused of killing the Tekfur of Karacahisar, Andros, and causing problems for the Kayı, Ural is sentenced to death, however, he is saved by the devious Emir Saadettin. After the death of Candar, the Çavdar Bey, and Ural's father, Ural seeks help from the new Tekfur of Karacahisar, Vasilius,  who lays an ambush for Doğan and Dündar which results in Doğan Alp being martyred and Dündar being seriously injured. Ural is later killed by Ertuğrul in an attempt to become the Bey of the Çavdar. When Vasilius attempts to ambush the Selçuk Sultan, he fails and is killed by Ertuğrul. Because of this, the Sultan makes Ertuğrul the Uç Bey angering Emir Saadettin who vows to end Ertuğrul. At the end of the season, Ertuğrul falls into an ambush set by the new Tekfur of Karacahisar, Ares.

Cast

Main characters 
 Engin Altan Düzyatan as Ertuğrul Bey
 Hülya Darcan as Hayme Ana
 Esra Bilgiç as Halime Hatun
 Cengiz Coşkun as Turgut Alp
 Nurettin Sönmez as Bamsı Beyrek
 Kürşat Alnıaçık as Ural Bey
 Çağdaş Onur Öztürk as Tekfur Vasilius
 Cem Uçan as Aliyar Bey

Supporting characters 
 Gülçin Santırcıoğlu as Çolpan Hatun/ Ekaterina
 Cavit Çetin Güner as Doğan Alp
  as Hafsa Hatun (formerly Helena)
 Gülsim Ali as Aslıhan Hatun
 Ayberk Pekcan as Artuk Bey
 Ozman Sirgood as İbn-i Arabi
 Lebip Gökhan as Hancı Simon
 Erden Alkan as Candar Bey
  as Sadettin Köpek
 Ezgi Esma as Banu Çiçek
 Batuhan Karacakaya as Dündar Bey

Minor characters
 Gökhan Karacık as Derviş İshak
 Osman Albayrak as Batuhan Alp
 Celal Al as Abdurrahman Alp
 Edip Zeydan as Dumrul Alp
 Gökhan Öskay as Kaya Alp
 Melikşah Özen as Melikşah Alp
 Gökhan Bekletenler as Haçaturyan Usta
 Melih Özdoğan as Samsa Alp
 Hakan Serim as Günkut Alp
  as Maria
 Elif Sümbül Sert as Amanda
  as Philip
 Fırat Topkorur as Petrus (disguised as Tüccar Hasan)
 Yaman Tümen as Gündüz Alp
 Mehmet Pala as Kutluca Alp
 Renan Karagözoğlu as Acar Bey
 Nazlı Yanılmaz as Günyelı Hatun

Guest characters 
 Hande Subaşı as Aykız Hatun
 Serhat Barış as Tristan
 Mert Soyyer as Aleko
 Gökmen Kasabalı as Francisco
 Burak Hakkı as Sultan Alaeddin Keykubat (disguised as Ebu Mansur)
 Cemal Hünal as Tekfur Ares
 Demir Parscan as Toktamış Bey
 Ozan Gözel as Laskaris
 Janbi Ceylan as Teo

Episodes

Notes

References

External links 
 

Diriliş: Ertuğrul and Kuruluş: Osman
2016 television seasons